Edward Masterson (born October 26, 1937) is an American coxswain. He competed in the men's coxed four event at the 1956 Summer Olympics.

References

1937 births
Living people
American male rowers
Olympic rowers of the United States
Rowers at the 1956 Summer Olympics
People from Laconia, New Hampshire
Coxswains (rowing)